"Summertime of Our Lives" is a song by British-Norwegian boy band A1. It was released on 30 August 1999 as the second single from their debut studio album, Here We Come (1999). The single was released on 30 August 1999 and peaked at  5 on the UK Singles Chart.

Track listings
UK CD1
 "Summertime of Our Lives" – 3:21
 "If You Were My Girl" – 4:50
 "Summertime of Our Lives" (Metro club mix) – 5:26
 CD extra

UK CD2
 "Summertime of Our Lives" – 3:21
 "Summertime of Our Lives" (Almighty club mix) – 8:16
 "Be the First to Believe" (K-Klass Reprise) – 6:35

UK cassette single
 "Summertime of Our Lives" – 3:21
 "If You Were My Girl" – 4:50

Charts

References

1999 singles
1999 songs
A1 (band) songs
Columbia Records singles
Songs written by Ben Adams
Songs written by Christian Ingebrigtsen
Songs written by Mark Read (singer)
Songs written by Paul Marazzi